The United States men's national junior ice hockey team represents the United States at the IIHF World U20 Championship.

The team has won five World Junior Championships (2004, 2010, 2013, 2017, 2021). Many NHL prospects, including John Carlson, Jack Eichel, Auston Matthews, Patrick Kane, Zach Parise, Adam Fox, and Matthew Tkachuk, played on this team.

World U20 Championship record
Record book data:
Note: 1974, 1975 and 1976 tournaments are considered unofficial. They are not included in the IIHF records.
1974 — 5th place
1975 — 6th place
1976 — did not participate
1977 — 7th place
1978 — 5th place
1979 — 6th place
1980 — 7th place
1981 — 6th place
1982 — 6th place
1983 — 5th place
1984 — 6th place
1985 — 6th place
1986 — 
1987 — 4th place
1988 — 6th place
1989 — 5th place
1990 — 7th place
1991 — 4th place
1992 — 
1993 — 4th place
1994 — 6th place
1995 — 5th place
1996 — 5th place
1997 — 
1998 — 5th place
1999 — 8th place
2000 — 4th place
2001 — 5th place
2002 — 5th place
2003 — 4th place
2004 — 
2005 — 4th place
2006 — 4th place
2007 — 
2008 — 4th place
2009 — 5th place
2010 — 
2011 — 
2012 — 7th place
2013 — 
2014 — 5th place
2015 — 5th place
2016 — 
2017 — 
2018 — 
2019 — 
2020 — 6th place
2021 — 
2022 — 5th place
2023 —

Team
Roster for the 2023 World Junior Ice Hockey Championships.

Head coach: Rand Pecknold

References

External links
Team USA U20 all-time scoring leaders - QuantHockey

National Junior team
Ice hockey
Junior national ice hockey teams